USCGC Point Hudson (WPB-82322) was an  Point class cutter constructed at the Coast Guard Yard at Curtis Bay, Maryland in 1961 for use as a law enforcement and search and rescue patrol boat.

Construction and design details
Point Hudson was built to accommodate an 8-man crew. She was powered by two  VT600 Cummins diesel main drive engines and had two five-bladed  propellers. The main drive engines were later replaced by  VT800 Cummins engines. Engine exhaust was ported through the transom rather than through a conventional stack and this permitted a 360-degree view from the bridge; a feature that was very useful in search and rescue work as well as a combat environment.

The design specifications for Point Hudson included a steel hull for durability and an aluminum superstructure and longitudinally framed construction was used to save weight. Ease of operation with a small crew size was possible because of the non-manned main drive engine spaces. Controls and alarms located on the bridge allowed one man operation of the cutter thus eliminating a live engineer watch in the engine room. Because of design, four men could operate the cutter; however, the need for resting watchstanders brought the crew size to eight men for normal domestic service. The screws were designed for ease of replacement and could be changed without removing the cutter from the water. A clutch-in idle speed of three knots helped to conserve fuel on lengthy patrols and an eighteen knot maximum speed could get the cutter on scene quickly. Air-conditioned interior spaces were a part of the original design for the Point class cutter. Interior access to the deckhouse was through a watertight door on the starboard side aft of the deckhouse. The deckhouse contained the cabin for the officer-in-charge and the executive petty officer. The deckhouse also included a small arms locker, scuttlebutt, a small desk and head. Access to the lower deck and engine room was down a ladder. At the bottom of the ladder was the galley, mess and recreation deck. A watertight door at the front of the mess bulkhead led to the main crew quarters which was ten feet long and included six bunks that could be stowed, three bunks on each side. Forward of the bunks was the crew's head complete with a compact sink, shower and commode. Accommodations for a 13-man crew were installed for Vietnam service.

History
After delivery in 1961, Point Hudson was assigned a homeport of Panama City, Florida, where she served as a law enforcement and search and rescue patrol boat.

At the request of the United States Navy, in October 1965, she was alerted for service in South Vietnam and assigned to Coast Guard Squadron One in support of Operation Market Time along with 8 other Point class cutters. While the crew completed overseas training and weapons qualifications at Coast Guard Island and Camp Parks, California, Point Hudson was loaded onto a merchant ship, and transported to Subic Bay, Philippines arriving in January 1966 where she was refitted for combat service. Shipyard modifications included installation of new single-sideband radio equipment, additional floodlights, small arms lockers, bunks, additional sound-powered phone circuits, and the addition of 4 M2 machine guns. The original Oerlikon 20 mm cannon was replaced with a combination over-under .50 caliber machine gun/81mm trigger fired mortar that had been developed by the Coast Guard for service in Vietnam. For service in Vietnam, two officers were added to the crew complement to add seniority to the crew in the mission of interdicting vessels at sea.

They arrived at their new duty station on 23 February and began patrolling the coastal waters near the Rung Sat Special Zone. Duty consisted of boarding Vietnamese junks to search for contraband weapons and ammunition and check the identification papers of persons on board.

While on patrol 22 March 1966 in the Rung Sat Special Zone Point Hudson drew fire from a Viet Cong (VC) junk on the Soi Rap River. In the battle that followed, an estimated ten VC were killed.

On 20 June 1966 Point Hudson along with Point League and Point Slocum assisted with the capture of a burning North Vietnamese trawler loaded with ammunition near the mouth of the Cổ Chiên River. Suppression fire from the mortars and machine guns of the Point Hudson were directed at VC troops firing on the other cutters while they attempted put out the fire and save possible intelligence on board the trawler. She also replenished Point Slocum with ammunition during the action.
 
On 1 March 1968, she was one of several Coast Guard cutters and U.S. Navy Patrol Craft Fasts that intercepted and destroyed an enemy trawler of the coast of the Ca Mau Peninsula.

As a part of the Vietnamization Program Republic of Vietnam Navy (RVNN) crewmen were assigned for training purposes beginning in February 1969. Many close relationships developed with the American-Vietnamese crews while training together and an example was the naming of his sixth child by Petty Officer First Class Le Chung. Because he thought so much of his American counterparts, he named his son "Le Hudson" in honor of the Point Hudson.

After the crew of Point Hudson trained an RVNN replacement crew, she was turned over to the RVNN as a part of the Vietnamization Program and recommissioned as RVNS Đặng Văn Hoành (HQ-707) on 11 Dec 1969.

See also
 Action of 1 March 1968

References
Notes

Bibliography

External links 
 "Point" Class 82-foot WPBs Coast Guard Historian's website

Hudson
1961 ships
Vietnam War patrol vessels of the United States
United States Coast Guard ships transferred to the Republic of Vietnam Navy
Ships built by the United States Coast Guard Yard